The Bahamian pygmy boa constrictor (Tropidophis canus), also known as the Inagua trope or Bahama wood snake, is a species of nonvenomous snake in the family Tropidophiidae. The species is endemic to Great Inagua Island in the Bahamas.

Description
The snake has the ability to change color through the movement of its dark pigment granules. Depending on the time of the day, a light or dark color may provide better camouflage. The Bahamian pygmy boa has a yellow-orange tail tip, which is likely used to lure unsuspecting prey.

Behavior
The Bahamian pygmy boa is mostly inactive during daytime hours, usually coming out at night. Most dwarf boas are terrestrial, meaning they live and breathe on earth, and rest underground or in vegetation. A few have adapted to being arboreal. Young boas live in trees and shrubs and feed mostly on anole lizards. Adult boas feed on frogs, birds and rats. If threatened, the snake has been observed to coil up into a tight ball similar to that of a ball python. On Andros Island the species is known as the "shame snake" because of this defensive tactic. It also has the ability to voluntarily bleed from its eyes, mouth, and nostrils.

References

Further reading
Bailey JR (1937). "A review of some recent Tropidophis material". Proc. New England Zool. Club 16: 41-52. (Tropidophis pardalis barbouri, new subspecies, p. 49).
Boulenger GA (1893). Catalogue of the Snakes in the British Museum (Natural History). Volume I., Containing the Families ... Boidæ ... London: Trustees of the British Museum (Natural History). (Taylor and Francis, printers). xiii + 448 pp. + Plates I-XXVIII. (Ungalia cana, p. 114).
Cope ED (1868). "An examination of the REPTILIA and BATRACHIA obtained by the Orton Expedition to Equador [sic] and the Upper Amazon, with notes on other Species". Proc. Acad. Nat. Sci. Philadelphia 20: 96-140. (Ungalia cana, new species, p. 129).
Garman S (1887). "On West Indian Reptiles in the Museum of Comparative Zoölogy, at Cambridge, Mass." Proc. American Philosoph. Soc. 24: 278-286. (Ungualia curta, new species, p. 279).
Schwartz A, Thomas R (1975). A Check-list of West Indian Amphibians and Reptiles. Carnegie Museum of Natural History Special Publication No. 1. Pittsburgh, Pennsylvania: Carnegie Museum of Natural History. 216 pp. (Tropidophis canus, pp. 191–192).
Stull OG (1928). "A Revision of the Genus Tropidophis ". Occ. Pap. Mus. Zool. Univ. Michigan (195): 1-52. (Tropidophis pardalis androsi, new subspecies, pp. 34–35).

External links
Ardastra Zoo Page

Tropidophiidae
Reptiles described in 1868
Snakes of the Caribbean
Reptiles of the Bahamas
Endemic fauna of the Bahamas
Taxa named by Edward Drinker Cope